Within the area of organocatalysis, (thio)urea organocatalysis describes the use of ureas and thioureas to accelerate and stereochemically alter organic transformations.  The effects arise through hydrogen-bonding interactions between the substrate and the (thio)urea.  Unlike classical catalysts, these organocatalysts interact by non-covalent interactions, especially hydrogen bonding ("partial protonation"). The scope of these small-molecule H-bond donors termed (thio)urea organocatalysis covers both non-stereoselective and stereoselective applications.

History
Pioneering contributions were made by Kelly, Etter, Jorgensen, Hine, Curran, Göbel, and De Mendoza (see review articles cited below) on hydrogen bonding interactions of small, metal-free compounds with electron-rich binding sites. Peter R. Schreiner and co-workers identified and introduced electron-poor thiourea derivatives as hydrogen-bonding organocatalysts. Schreiner's thiourea, N,N-bis3,5-bis(trifluormethyl)phenyl thiourea, combines all structural features for double H-bonding mediated organocatalysis:
 electron-poor
 rigid structure
 non-coordinating, electron withdrawing substituents in 3,4, and/or 5 position of a phenyl ring
 the 3,5-bis(trifluoromethyl)phenyl-group is the preferred substituent

Catalyst-substrate interactions
Hydrogen-bonding between thiourea derivatives and carbonyl substrates involve two hydrogen bonds provided by coplanar amino substituents in the (thio)urea.  Squaramides engage in double H-bonding interactions and are often superior to thioureas.

Advantages of thiourea organocatalysts
Thio) ureas are green and sustainable catalysts.  When effective, they can offer these advantages:
 absence of product inhibition due to weak enthalpic binding, but specific binding-“recognition“
 low catalyst-loading (down to 0.001 mol%)
 high TOF (Turn-Over-Frequency) values (up to 5,700 h−1)
 simple and inexpensive synthesis from primary amine functionalized (chiral-pool) starting materials and isothiocyanates
 easy to modulate and to handle (bench-stable), no inert gas atmosphere required
 immobilization on a solid phase (polymer-bound organocatalysts), catalyst recovery and reusability 
 catalysis under almost neutral conditions (pka thiourea 21.0) and mild conditions, acid-sensitive substrates are tolerated
 metal-free, nontoxic (compare traditional metal-containing Lewis-acid catalysts)
 water-tolerant, even catalytically effective in water or aqueous media.

Substrates
H-bond accepting substrates include carbonyl compounds, imines, nitroalkenes. The Diels-Alder reaction is one process that can benefit from (thio)urea catalysts.

Catalysts
A broad variety of monofunctional and bifunctional (concept of bifunctionality) chiral double hydrogen-bonding (thio)urea organocatalysts have been developed to accelerate various synthetically useful organic transformations

Further reading

References

Ureas
Catalysis